The 2nd Proletarian Division (Serbo-Croatian Latin: Druga proleterska divizija) was a Yugoslav Partisan division formed in Tičevo on 1 November 1942. It was formed from 2nd Proletarian Brigade, 4th Proletarian Brigade and 2nd Dalmatia Brigade, at the time of formation it consisted of around 2,680 soldiers. The unit took part in almost all important Partisan operations. On 1 September 1943, it became part of the 2nd Assault Corps.

References 

 

Divisions of the Yugoslav Partisans
Military units and formations established in 1942